Moss phlox is a common name for several plants and may refer to:
 Phlox stolonifera
 Phlox subulata